Emanuel Piaskowy (born 2 March 1991) is a Polish former racing cyclist, who rode professionally between 2014 and 2020, for the ,  and  teams.

Major results

2013
 10th Overall Tour of Małopolska
1st  Young rider classification
2014
 3rd  Road race, World University Cycling Championship
2015
 4th Korona Kocich Gór
 5th GP Polski, Visegrad 4 Bicycle Race
 7th Overall Tour of Małopolska
 7th Memorial Grundmanna I Wizowskiego
2016
 2nd Hets Hatsafon
2017
 3rd Road race, National Road Championships
 3rd Overall Szlakiem Grodów Piastowskich
 4th Korona Kocich Gór
 8th Overall Bałtyk–Karkonosze Tour
1st  Mountains classification
 10th Overall Tour of Małopolska
2019
 5th Overall Tour of Małopolska
2020
 3rd Overall Tour de Serbie
1st Stage 2
 4th Overall Belgrade–Banja Luka

References

External links

1991 births
Living people
Polish male cyclists
People from Nowy Sącz